The Ridgefields are a pair of municipalities in Bergen County, New Jersey, both of which have the word Ridgefield in their name. The two municipalities are the Borough of Ridgefield and the Village of Ridgefield Park.

Both municipalities had been part of Ridgefield Township, a township that had existed in southeastern Bergen County, that was created in 1871. Ridgefield Borough and Ridgefield Park Village were each formed from portions of Ridgefield Township in 1892. Several more boroughs were formed from Ridgefield Township before the end of the 19th century. With the formation of Fort Lee in 1904, Ridgefield Township met its demise, and the two municipalities were left to carry on its name.

While each community has its own independent government, and the two municipalities have no shared governance (other than Bergen County), the term is often used to refer to the area, including on highway exit signs. Signage for Exit 68 on Interstate 95 (the New Jersey Turnpike) refer to "The Ridgefields" as a destination.

See also
For other groups of similarly named municipalities in New Jersey, see:
The Amboys
The Brunswicks
The Caldwells
The Oranges
The Plainfields
The Wildwoods